Imagination is the fourth studio album by American singer-songwriter La Toya Jackson. The album was released on by Private-I Records (an extension of Epic Records).

Album information 
Private-I Records went bankrupt shortly after the album's release in 1986. Because of the record company's financial problems, the promotion was poor for the album and it failed to chart. Three singles were released, the first being "Baby Sister", which was released in Japan, followed by "He's a Pretender" and a remix of the title track. In November 2011, Funky Town Grooves announced that it would be issuing the Imagination album on CD for the first time, using the original master tapes as their source. The disc was released in February 2012 and featured four bonus tracks.

Reception 

The Baltimore Afro-American described the album's production as "pop-oriented", "well recorded and mixed". The "new waveish" "Baby Sister" was complimented as "ear candy". Allmusic singled out "How Do I Tell Them" as having an "instantly memorable chorus and gripping rhythmic structure" but dismissed the rest of the album as "disposable".

Track listing

References 

1986 albums
La Toya Jackson albums
Synth-pop albums by American artists